Son Pari is an Indian children's fantasy adventure television series which aired from 23 November 2000 to 1 October 2004 on Star Plus. The series follows the story of Fruity, a young girl who receives a magical ball that, when rubbed, summons a fairy named Son Pari and her friend Altu.

Plot
Bunty, a scientist's apprentice, catches a dove to give it to his boss to use in an experiment. Bunty and the scientist want to capture Son Pari and use her to become rich by showing her off to the world. Fruity set the dove free, not knowing that the bird was Son Pari (Golden Fairy), who often comes to Earth with the permission of the fairy queen, called Pari Ma (Fairy Mother).

Fruity's mother died long ago. Fruity goes to the terrace to look at the stars, as she believes her mother is one of them. One night Son Pari comes to her and offers her friendship in return for the assistance Fruity once gave her. This starts the story of their strange friendship. Son Pari and Altu start meeting Fruity regularly and have many adventures. They help her get rid of Ruby, a woman who wants to marry Fruity's father, Rohit, for his money. Although Ruby's brother helps Ruby, Son Pari and Altu, make sure they don't succeed. Later, Son Pari realizes that Fruity is in great danger, for it is written in the prophecies that Fruity will kill Kali Pari (Dark Fairy), who is the main villain of Season 2. For a short while, Son Pari makes Tooty, a fairy who is Fruity's look-alike, take care of Fruity and protects her from Kali Pari.

Much later, a new character, Princy, comes into the picture, who will be able to see Son Pari and Altu despite them being invisible to everyone. The series contains multiple subplots and finally, Fruity will be able to kill Kaali Pari and thus the darkness ends.

Cast

Broadcasting
Son Pari originally aired on Star Plus channel from November 2000 and 1 October 2004. Re-runs of the show also aired omn Star Utsav, STAR One and Disney Channel India.

References

External links
Official Site on Star Plus

Indian fantasy television series
2000 Indian television series debuts
StarPlus original programming
Indian children's television series
2004 Indian television series endings
Television about fairies and sprites
Gulzar